Muscodor roseus is an anamorphic fungus in the family Xylariaceae. It is an endophyte that colonizes the inner bark, sapwood and outer xylem of the plants Grevillea pteridifolia and Erythrophleum chlorostachys, found in the Northern Territory of Australia. It grows as a pinkish, felt-like mycelium on several media, and produces a mixture of volatile antibiotics. Cultures tend to have a musty odour. The specific epithet roseus means "pink".

References

Further reading
Grimme, Eva. (2004). Effects of mycofumigation using Muscodor albus and Muscodor roseus on diseases of sugar beet and chrysanthemum [electronic resource]/by Eva Grimme. Diss. Montana State University-Bozeman, College of Agriculture.

External links

Xylariales
Fungi described in 2002
Fungi of Australia